Albert Albers Barn, in Doniphan County, Kansas near Bendena, Kansas, was built in about 1897.  It was listed on the National Register of Historic Places in 1987.  It has also been known as Caudle Farms Barn.

It is a one-story, three-bay, side entrance, board and batten barn built on a limestone foundation.

References

Barns on the National Register of Historic Places in Kansas
Buildings and structures completed in 1897
Doniphan County, Kansas
Barns in Kansas